Iturbide may refer to:
Iturbide (surname)
House of Iturbide, imperial house of Mexico
Agustín de Iturbide
Iturbide, Nuevo León
Iturbide Bridge, a locale of the Tampico Affair
Villa de Hidalgo, San Luis Potosí